"Angels & Stars" is a song by Swedish-American singer Eric Turner, featuring vocals from American rapper Lupe Fiasco and British rapper Tinie Tempah. The song was released as Turner's debut solo single in the United States on January 31, 2012. An EP of remixes was later released to digital outlets on April 3, 2012.

Background
"Angels & Stars" was written by Turner, Tinie Tempah, Lupe Fiasco and "iSHi" Mughal, and produced by the latter. The song was first leaked online on January 18, 2012, before being officially released on January 31, 2012. The music video was released via Vevo on February 3, 2012. The video was directed by P.R. Brown. A five-minute behind-the-scenes video was released two days prior to the official premiere. The video features Turner walking down a busy sidewalk to a building, which he eventually jumps onto and starts walking up. Whilst doing this, clips of Turner, Lupe Fiasco, Tinie Tempah and, briefly, iSHi, are seen on the wall. At the end of the video, Turner jumps off the wall and walks away.

Track listing
 Digital download
 "Angels & Stars" (featuring Lupe Fiasco and Tinie Tempah) - 3:34

 Digital EP
 "Angels & Stars" (iSHi Rock Re-Edit) - 3:24
 "Angels & Stars" (2Stripes Radio Edit) - 3:28
 "Angels & Stars" (R3hab Club Mix) - 5:26
 "Angels & Stars" (Nevins Club Mix) - 6:30
 "Angels & Stars" (Nause Remix) - 5:33

Release history

References

2012 debut singles
Lupe Fiasco songs
Tinie Tempah songs
2012 songs
Capitol Records singles
Songs written by Eshraque "iSHi" Mughal
Songs written by Tinie Tempah
Songs written by Lupe Fiasco
Songs written by Eric Turner (singer)